Alvin and the Chipmunks: Chipwrecked is a 2011 American live-action/computer-animated jukebox musical adventure comedy film directed by Mike Mitchell. It is the third film starring Alvin and the Chipmunks following the 2009 film The Squeakquel, and the first. The film's main cast includes: Jason Lee, David Cross and Jenny Slate. Justin Long, Matthew Gray Gubler, Jesse McCartney, Amy Poehler, Anna Faris and Christina Applegate return as the Chipmunks and Chipettes, respectively. Distributed by 20th Century Fox and produced by Fox 2000 Pictures, Regency Enterprises and Bagdasarian Productions.

The film was released on December 16, 2011, and grossed $343 million on an $80 million budget, to even worse reviews than the previous films. A fourth and final film, The Road Chip, was released on December 18, 2015.

Plot

Dave, the Chipmunks, and the Chipettes go on a cruise ship en route to the International Music Awards. Both parties end up creating trouble; culminating in Dave having dinner with the captain to apologize for the trouble. He tells them to stay in their room, only for all of them (except Theodore) to escape to the casinos. Dave discovers his former supervisor Ian Hawke is working as the ship's safety monitor posing as a pelican, and is out to inform the captain if the Chipmunks and Chipettes stir up more trouble. The next day, Alvin decides to go para-sailing on a kite but the kite flies away with him and the other Chipmunks. Dave goes on a hang-glider to try to find them but Ian attempts to stop him, which results in them both ending up stranded in the Pacific Ocean.

Meanwhile, the Chipmunks find an island and they sleep for the night. Dave enlists Ian's help to find the same island and begin looking for the Chipmunks. The next morning the Chipmunks go and find food and while doing so, an island castaway named Zoe shows up and sees the chipmunks for the first time. They then go to Zoe's tree house where Eleanor sprains her ankle and Simon gets bitten by a spider; its side effects including personality changes and loss of inhibition.

The morning after, everyone observes Simon's personality changed where he thinks he's a French adventurous chipmunk named "Simon(e)". "Simone" becomes attracted to Jeanette but does not take as kindly to Alvin and Brittany. Later, Zoe takes "Simone", Jeanette, Eleanor and Theodore to a lake with a waterfall and "Simone" finds a cave. He returns with a gold bracelet which he gives to Jeanette as a crown. Brittany and Alvin see an active volcano the next day and they decide that they have to leave the island with the others. Theodore and "Simone" find Dave and Ian and they go to meet with the other chipmunks. They all begin to prepare a raft to get them off the island and everyone is assigned a job. When Jeanette and "Simone" go and look for food, "Simone" is knocked unconscious and Jeanette is kidnapped; "Simone" reverts to Simon afterwards.

Everyone finds Simon awake and he cannot remember anything since the spider previously bit him. They discover that Zoe has taken Jeanette and they head towards the waterfall. When they approached the tree log to cross, Dave and Alvin decide to go and find Jeanette. As Zoe forces Jeanette to get the treasure in the cave by tying her to a rope, she reveals that she was never a castaway, but came to the island intentionally to find the treasure, but due to the effects of living alone on the island for ten years, her memory has been wiped out and is ruthlessly willing to find the treasure at all costs. Alvin and Dave come to her rescue. The island begins to rumble again and Zoe lets go of the rope and Jeanette runs with Dave and Alvin back to the raft. When they reach the log to cross, Dave almost falls.

Alvin and a reformed Ian convince Zoe to help save Dave. They then run towards the raft and escape the eruption. While on the raft, Zoe apologizes to Jeanette for kidnapping her and forcing her to get the treasure. As a gift, Jeanette gives Zoe the gold bracelet that Simon had given to her. Alvin reconciles with Dave and they are rescued. The Chipmunks and Chipettes perform at the International Music Awards. Ian also starts a new career as a screenwriter by selling a screenplay about Zoe's story to Hollywood, finally resurrecting his fortune and making Zoe famous.

In a mid-credits scene, the Chipmunks, the Chipettes and Dave are on a plane heading home. Alvin tricks the other passengers into thinking they’re going to Timbuktu, much to Dave’s annoyance.

Cast
 Jason Lee as David "Dave" Seville
 David Cross as Ian Hawke
 Jenny Slate as Zoe
 Justin Long as Alvin Seville (voice)
 Ross Bagdasarian Jr. as Alvin Seville (singing voice)
 Matthew Gray Gubler as Simon Seville (voice)
 Steve Vining as Simon Seville (singing voice)
 Alan Tudyk as "Simone", Simon's adventurous French alter ego after getting bitten by a spider that gives him amnesia. (voice)
 Jesse McCartney as Theodore Seville (voice)
 Janice Karman as Theodore Seville (singing voice)
 Christina Applegate as Brittany (voice)
 Janice Karman as Brittany (singing voice)
 Anna Faris as Jeanette (voice)
 Janice Karman as Jeanette (singing voice)
 Amy Poehler as Eleanor (voice)
 Janice Karman as Eleanor (singing voice)
 Luisa D'Oliveira as Tessa
 Andy Buckley as Captain Correlli
 Tucker Albrizzi as Kite Kid
 Phyllis Smith as Flight Attendant

Production
On October 26, 2010, according to 24 Frames from the Los Angeles Times, Mike Mitchell, the director behind Shrek Forever After, was in negotiations with 20th Century Fox to direct the new film. The film featured one of Carnival's newest and biggest cruise ships, Carnival Dream. The external shots and interior stateroom suite were filmed during a seven-day Caribbean cruise. The casino, dance club, and dining room were filmed on a set not attempting to match the actual interior of the Carnival Dream cruise ship.

Release
Alvin and the Chipmunks: Chipwrecked was released in the U.S. on December 16, 2011, and was the first and only live-action/CGI Chipmunks film to be rated G by the MPAA.

Home media
Alvin and the Chipmunks: Chipwrecked was released on DVD and Blu-ray on March 27, 2012, from 20th Century Fox Home Entertainment.

Reception

Box office
The film grossed a total of $133,110,742 in North America, and another $209,584,693 internationally, for a total worldwide gross of $342,695,435. Alvin and the Chipmunks: Chipwrecked made $6.7 million on its opening day, which was lower than the opening day grosses of the original film ($13.3 million) and its sequel ($18.8 million). For its opening weekend, the film ranked at the #2 spot behind Sherlock Holmes: A Game of Shadows with $23.2 million, which was less than the opening weekends of the franchise's previous two films, the original film's $44.3 million and its sequel's $48.9 million respectively.

Critical response
On Rotten Tomatoes, the film has an approval rating of 12% based on 82 reviews and an average rating of 3.51/10. The site's critical consensus reads, "Lazy, rote, and grating, Chipwrecked is lowest-common-denominator family entertainment that's strictly for the very, very, very young at heart." On Metacritic, the film has a score of 24 out of 100 based on 19 critics, indicating "generally unfavorable reviews". Audiences polled by CinemaScore gave the film an average grade of "B+" on an A+ to F scale.

John Anderson of Variety wrote: "As impressive as the CG elements are in 'Chipwrecked,' they're a mixed blessing: The more lifelike the techies make the critters—Alvin (voiced by Justin Long), Theodore (Jesse McCartney) and Simon (Matthew Gray Gubler) —the more we're reminded they're rodents."
Michael Rechtshaffen of The Hollywood Reporter called it "Every bit as frantic, frenetic, groan-inducing and all around grating as its two predecessors."

David Cross, who played Ian in this film and the previous two installments, has spoken critically of making the film, calling it "the most miserable experience I ever had in my professional life". He had no problems with the other actors or director, but said there were a couple of people who made it an awful experience.

Accolades
 2012 BMI Film & TV Awards: Film Music Award for Mark Mothersbaugh (winner)
 2012 Kids' Choice Awards: Favorite Movie (winner)
 2012 Teen Choice Awards: Choice Movie Voice for Jesse McCartney (nominated)

Soundtrack

Alvin and the Chipmunks: Chipwrecked: Music from the Motion Picture is the licensed soundtrack based on the film. It was released on November 15, 2011, by Atlantic Records. Released to US Target stores, a limited edition version of the soundtrack was released containing four exclusive bonus tracks. iTunes and Amazon.com released a deluxe edition available only on digital download containing three bonus tracks.

Track listing

Chipwrecked - Queensberry Chipwrecked - Queensberry (feat. The Chipmunks) (*) - denotes original song

Chart performance

Weekly charts

Year-end charts

Video game

Alvin and the Chipmunks: Chipwrecked is a video game based on the film. It was released for the Wii, Nintendo DS, and Xbox 360 on November 15, 2011, in North America and on November 25, 2011, in Europe. Like the previous "Alvin & The Chipmunks" and "Squeakquel" video game adaptations, Ross Bagdasarian Jr. and Janice Karman reprised their respective roles.

Sequel

In June 2013, 20th Century Fox announced that a sequel, Alvin and the Chipmunks: The Road Chip, would be released on December 11, 2015. On December 18, 2014, however, it was announced for a December 23, 2015 release. On October 14, 2015, the release date was pushed forward to December 18, 2015.

References

External links

 
 
 
 
 
 
 Official Soundtrack Website

2011 films
2010s adventure comedy films
2010s musical comedy films
Alvin and the Chipmunks films
Live-action films based on animated series
American adventure comedy films
American children's animated adventure films
American children's animated comedy films
American fantasy films
American musical comedy films
American sequel films
American films with live action and animation
20th Century Fox films
Dune Entertainment films
2010s English-language films
Films scored by Mark Mothersbaugh
Films directed by Mike Mitchell
Films shot in Hawaii
Films set on cruise ships
Films with screenplays by Jonathan Aibel and Glenn Berger
Regency Enterprises films
2011 comedy films
Films produced by Ross Bagdasarian Jr.
Films produced by Janice Karman
Films about rodents
Films about vacationing
Jukebox musical films
2010s American films